The AGEUS Award for Individual Contribution began in 2006.  It is presented annually during the meeting of the Annual Georgia European Union Summit, and goes to an individual who has shown exceptional success and dedication in fostering foreign economic development in the State of Georgia, USA.

Prior AGEUS Award winners 
2006: Christopher N. Smith, Honorary Consul of the Kingdom of Denmark to Georgia, for his work bringing Danish companies to Georgia.
2007: James Blair of the Georgia Department of Economic Development for his 19 years of ongoing work in Europe on behalf of Georgia business.
2008: Not awarded
2009: Dr. Bruce S. Allen for his work in foreign relations and economic development.
2010: Not awarded

See also

 List of economics awards

References 
 Global Atlanta article

Awards established in 2006
Economic development awards
American awards